Coleophora pelinopis is a moth of the family Coleophoridae. It is found in Mexico.

References

peisoniella
Moths of Central America
Moths described in 1933